Sheboygan High School is the name of numerous high schools in and around Sheboygan, Wisconsin:
 Sheboygan Falls High School  
 Sheboygan High School (founded 1857), the city's first high school 
 Sheboygan North High School (est. 1938)
 Sheboygan South High School (est. 1960)
 Sheboygan County Christian High School (est. 1969)
 Sheboygan Lutheran High School (est. 1978)